Bleasdalea papuana is a species of plant in the family Proteaceae. It is found in West Papua in Indonesia and Papua New Guinea. It is threatened by habitat loss.

References

papuana
Endemic flora of New Guinea
Flora of Papua New Guinea
Flora of Western New Guinea
Endangered flora of Oceania
Taxonomy articles created by Polbot